Government Residential Women's Polytechnic Latur (GRWPL) is Maharashtra's first women's polytechnic founded in 1994. It is situated alongside of Barsi Road in Latur. 

GRWPL had a distinguished history in Medical Electronics, Electronics & Telecommunication Engineering, 
Dress Designing & Garment Manufacturing, Civil Engineering and Computer Engineering.

Campus
GRWPL played a leadership role in bringing about Latur Center, one of the largest urban campus in the state and the largest in Marathwada. Today, the 34-acre (65,000 m2), $36 million complex is home to the institute and several technology-dependent companies.
GRWPL has proven to be a case study in effective university, corporate, government and private-developer cooperation.

Academics

Departments 

 Computer
 Electronics
 Medical Electronics
 Dress Designing
 Science

Interest groups

The mission of the polytechnic is to provide an interdisciplinary environment for the engineering and construction of original robotic and mechanical devices. The polytechnic presents the means by which students can learn and excel in multiple technical and engineering fields through hands-on experience.

External links 
Government Residential Women's Polytechnic Latur
DTE 
Education in Latur
India Study Channel
Global Shiksha

References

Women's universities and colleges in Maharashtra
Polytechnics in Latur
Educational institutions established in 1994
1994 establishments in Maharashtra